Kevin McGiven (born March 19, 1977) is an American football coach and former player. He is currently the offensive coordinator at San Jose State University.

Playing career
McGiven played wide receiver at Eastern Arizona College in 1995 for head coach Paul Tidwell. He then transferred to Louisiana Tech and played two seasons for head coach Gary Crowton, who is also from Orem, Utah.

Coaching career

Early coaching career
Following his playing career, McGiven was a student assistant for Louisiana Tech for the 1998 season.

McGiven took some time off before joining the coaching staff at his alma mater, Mountain View High School in Orem, Utah, in 2001, coaching the wide receivers and tight ends.

From 2002 to 2004, McGiven reunited with Crowton at BYU as an offensive graduate assistant.

Southern Utah
In 2005, McGiven served as the offensive coordinator at Southern Utah. He also coached the quarterbacks and wide receivers.

Weber State
From 2006 to 2008, McGiven was the offensive coordinator and quarterbacks coach on Ron McBride's staff at Weber State. His 2008 offense produced four All-Americans: Cameron Higgins, Tim Toone, Trevyn Smith, and Cody Nakamura.

First stint at Utah State
In 2009, McGiven joined the Utah State staff as the assistant head coach and quarterbacks coach. Utah State's offense improved from number 89 in the country to number 14.

Memphis
McGiven was the assistant head coach, quarterbacks coach, and recruiting coordinator for new head coach Larry Porter.

Montana State
In 2012, McGiven was the offensive coordinator and quarterbacks coach for the Montana State Bobcats football team. That year, Montana State reached the FCS quarterfinals. McGiven coached Big Sky Conference offensive MVP Denarius McGhee.

Return to Utah State
McGiven returned to Utah State for the 2013 and 2014 seasons as the offensive coordinator and quarterbacks coach. In 2014, he was named the Football Scoop Quarterback Coach of the Year.

Oregon State
In 2015, McGiven joined the Oregon State coaching staff as the quarterbacks coach. He took over the only quarterbacks room in the nation with no quarterback playing experience.
In 2016, McGiven was promoted to co-offensive coordinator and was the primary play caller. OSU averaged 14 yards per game more rush and passing, both, from the previous year. The Beavers also scored 7.2 more points per game.
In 2017, McGiven was the sole offensive coordinator.

San Jose State
In January 2018, McGiven joined former Oregon State assistant Brent Brennan's staff at San Jose State as their offensive coordinator.

Personal life

McGiven and his wife, Lindsay, have three sons, Peyton, K. J., Beau, and their daughter, Ireland. He earned his Bachelors in Business Management from Utah Valley University in 2001, and his Master's in physical education from BYU in 2005.

References

External links
 San Jose State profile

1977 births
Living people
American football wide receivers
BYU Cougars football coaches
Eastern Arizona Gila Monsters football players
Louisiana Tech Bulldogs football coaches
Louisiana Tech Bulldogs football players
Memphis Tigers football coaches
Montana State Bobcats football coaches
Oregon State Beavers football coaches
San Jose State Spartans football coaches
Southern Utah Thunderbirds football coaches
Utah State Aggies football coaches
Weber State Wildcats football coaches
High school football coaches in Utah
Utah Valley University alumni
People from Orem, Utah
Players of American football from Utah